The Solar Dynamics Observatory (SDO) is a NASA mission which has been observing the Sun since 2010. Launched on 11 February 2010, the observatory is part of the Living With a Star (LWS) program.

The goal of the LWS program is to develop the scientific understanding necessary to effectively address those aspects of the connected Sun–Earth system directly affecting life and society. The goal of the SDO is to understand the influence of the Sun on the Earth and near-Earth space by studying the solar atmosphere on small scales of space and time and in many wavelengths simultaneously. SDO has been investigating how the Sun's magnetic field is generated and structured, how this stored magnetic energy is converted and released into the heliosphere and geospace in the form of solar wind, energetic particles, and variations in the solar irradiance.

General 

The SDO spacecraft was developed at NASA's Goddard Space Flight Center in Greenbelt, Maryland, and launched on 11 February 2010, from Cape Canaveral Air Force Station (CCAFS). The primary mission lasted five years and three months, with expendables expected to last at least ten years. Some consider SDO to be a follow-on mission to the Solar and Heliospheric Observatory (SOHO).

SDO is a three-axis stabilized spacecraft, with two solar arrays, and two high-gain antennas, in an inclined geosynchronous orbit around Earth.

The spacecraft includes three instruments: 
 the Extreme Ultraviolet Variability Experiment (EVE) built in partnership with the University of Colorado Boulder's Laboratory for Atmospheric and Space Physics (LASP), 
 the Helioseismic and Magnetic Imager (HMI) built in partnership with Stanford University, and 
 the Atmospheric Imaging Assembly (AIA) built in partnership with the Lockheed Martin Solar and Astrophysics Laboratory (LMSAL).

Data which is collected by the craft is made available as soon as possible, after it is received.

As of February 2020, SDO is expected to remain operational until 2030.

Instruments

Helioseismic and Magnetic Imager (HMI) 

The Helioseismic and Magnetic Imager (HMI), led from Stanford University in Stanford, California, studies solar variability and characterizes the Sun's interior and the various components of magnetic activity. HMI takes high-resolution measurements of the longitudinal and vector magnetic field over the entire visible solar disk thus extending the capabilities of SOHO's MDI instrument.

HMI produces data to determine the interior sources and mechanisms of solar variability and how the physical processes inside the Sun are related to surface magnetic field and activity. It also produces data to enable estimates of the coronal magnetic field for studies of variability in the extended solar atmosphere. HMI observations will enable establishing the relationships between the internal dynamics and magnetic activity in order to understand solar variability and its effects.

Extreme Ultraviolet Variability Experiment (EVE) 

The Extreme Ultraviolet Variability Experiment (EVE) measures the Sun's extreme ultraviolet irradiance with improved spectral resolution, "temporal cadence", accuracy, and precision over preceding measurements made by TIMED SEE, SOHO, and SORCE XPS. The instrument incorporates physics-based models in order to further scientific understanding of the relationship between solar EUV variations and magnetic variation changes in the Sun.

The Sun's output of energetic extreme ultraviolet photons is primarily what heats the Earth's upper atmosphere and creates the ionosphere. Solar EUV radiation output undergoes constant changes, both moment to moment and over the Sun's 11-year solar cycle, and these changes are important to understand because they have a significant impact on atmospheric heating, satellite drag, and communications system degradation, including disruption of the Global Positioning System.

The EVE instrument package was built by the University of Colorado Boulder's Laboratory for Atmospheric and Space Physics (LASP), with Dr. Tom Woods as principal investigator, and was delivered to NASA Goddard Space Flight Center on 7 September 2007. The instrument provides improvements of up to 70% in spectral resolution measurements in the wavelengths below 30 nm, and a 30% improvement in "time cadence" by taking measurements every 10 seconds over a 100% duty cycle.

Atmospheric Imaging Assembly (AIA) 
The Atmospheric Imaging Assembly (AIA), led from the Lockheed Martin Solar and Astrophysics Laboratory (LMSAL), provides continuous full-disk observations of the solar chromosphere and corona in seven extreme ultraviolet (EUV) channels, spanning a temperature range from approximately 20,000 Kelvin to in excess of 20 million Kelvin. The 12-second cadence of the image stream with 4096 by 4096 pixel images at 0.6 arcsec/pixel provides unprecedented views of the various phenomena that occur within the evolving solar outer atmosphere.

The AIA science investigation is led by LMSAL, which also operates the instrument and – jointly with Stanford University – runs the Joint Science Operations Center from which all of the data are served to the worldwide scientific community, as well as the general public. LMSAL designed the overall instrumentation and led its development and integration. The four telescopes providing the individual light feeds for the instrument were designed and built at the Smithsonian Astrophysical Observatory (SAO). Since beginning its operational phase on 1 May 2010, AIA has operated successfully with unprecedented EUV image quality.

Photographs of the Sun in these various regions of the spectrum can be seen at NASA's SDO Data website. Images and movies of the Sun seen on any day of the mission, including within the last half-hour, can be found at The Sun Today.

Communications 
SDO down-links science data (K-band) from its two onboard high-gain antennas, and telemetry (S-band) from its two onboard omnidirectional antennas. The ground station consists of two dedicated (redundant) 18-meter radio antennas in White Sands Missile Range, New Mexico, constructed specifically for SDO. Mission controllers operate the spacecraft remotely from the Mission Operations Center at NASA Goddard Space Flight Center. The combined data rate is about 130 Mbit/s (150 Mbit/s with overhead, or 300 Msymbols/s with rate 1/2 convolutional encoding), and the craft generates approximately 1.5 Terabytes of data per day (equivalent to downloading around 500,000 songs).

Launch 

NASA's Launch Services Program at Kennedy Space Center managed the payload integration and launch. The SDO launched from Cape Canaveral Space Launch Complex 41 (SLC-41), utilizing an Atlas V-401 rocket with a RD-180 powered Common Core Booster, which has been developed to meet the Evolved Expendable Launch Vehicle (EELV) program requirements.

Orbit 

This orbit was chosen to allow 24/7 communications to/from the fixed ground station, and to minimise solar eclipses to about an hour a day for only a few weeks a year.

Sun dog phenomenon 
Moments after launch, SDO's Atlas V rocket penetrated a cirrus cloud which created visible shock waves in the sky and destroyed the alignment of ice crystals that were forming a sun dog visible to onlookers.

Mission mascot - Camilla 
Camilla Corona is a rubber chicken (similar to a children's toy), and is the mission mascot for SDO. It is part of the Education and public outreach team and assists with various functions to help educate the public, mainly children, about the SDO mission, facts about the Sun and Space weather. Camilla also assists in cross-informing the public about other NASA missions and space related projects. Camilla Corona SDO uses social media to interact with fans.

Image gallery

Stamps 

NASA's images of the Sun's dynamic and dazzling beauty have captivated the attention of millions. In 2021, the U.S. Postal Service is showcasing the Sun's many faces with a series of Sun Science forever stamps that show images of solar activity captured by NASA's Solar Dynamics Observatory (SDO). "I have been a stamp collector all my life and I can't wait to see NASA science highlighted in this way", said Thomas Zurbuchen, associate administrator for NASA's Science Mission Directorate (SMD) in Washington, D.C. "I feel that the natural world around us is as beautiful as art, and it is inspiring to be able to share the import and excitement of studying the Sun with people around the country".

The 20-stamp set features ten images that celebrate the science behind NASA's ongoing exploration of our nearest star. The images display common events on the Sun, such as solar flares, sunspots and coronal loops. SDO has kept a constant eye on the Sun for over a decade. Outfitted with equipment to capture images of the Sun in multiple wavelengths of visible, ultraviolet, and extreme ultraviolet light, SDO has gathered hundreds of millions of images during its tenure to help scientists learn about how our star works and how its constantly churning magnetic fields create the solar activity we see.

That solar activity can drive space weather closer to Earth that can interfere with technology and radio communications in space. In addition to this immediate relevancy to our high-tech daily lives, the study of the Sun and its influence on the planets and space surrounding it – a field of research known as heliophysics – holds profound implications for the understanding of our Solar System and the thousands of solar systems that have been discovered beyond our own. As our closest star, the Sun is the only nearby star that humans are able to study in great detail, making it a vital source of data.

See also 

 Heliophysics
 Advanced Composition Explorer
 Parker Solar Probe
 Radiation Belt Storm Probes (Van Allen Probes)
 Richard R. Fisher
 Solar and Heliospheric Observatory (SOHO)
 STEREO (Solar TErrestrial RElations Observatory), launched 2006, 1 of 2 spacecraft still operational.
 Wind (spacecraft), launched 1994, still operational.
 List of heliophysics missions

References

External links 

 Solar Dynamics Observatory (SDO) mission website
 Where is the Solar Dynamics Observatory (SDO) right now?
 SDO Outreach Material, HELAS
 Inbound SOHO comet disintegrates as seen in SDO AIA images (Cometal 14 July 2011)
 History of SDO patch, Facebook
 Sunspot Database based on SDO (HMI) satellite observations from 2010 to nowadays with the newest data.
 Album of images and videos by Seán Doran, based on SDO imagery, and a longer (24 min.) YouTube video: Sun Dance
 SDO 5-year timelapse video of the Sun
 SDO 10-year timelapse video of the Sun

Instruments 
 Extreme Ultraviolet Variability Experiment (EVE) , University of Colorado
 ATMOSPHERIC IMAGING ASSEMBLY (AIA), Lockheed Martin
 Helioseismic and Magnetic Imager (HMI), Stanford
 Joint Science Operations Center – Science Data Processing HMI – AIA

Space probes launched in 2010
NASA space probes
Living With a Star
Missions to the Sun
Solar space observatories
Solar telescopes
Space weather
Articles containing video clips
Spacecraft launched by Atlas rockets